The American Association for Palestinian Equal Rights (AAPER) is an American pro-Palestinian lobby group, founded in 2003.

References

External links
 AAPER website

Foreign policy lobbying organizations in the United States
2003 establishments in the United States
Foreign policy political advocacy groups in the United States
United States–Middle Eastern relations
Israel–United States relations
State of Palestine–United States relations